Piola quiabentiae is a species of beetle in the family Cerambycidae. It was described by Marinoni in 1974. It is known from Argentina and Brazil.

References

Phacellini
Beetles described in 1974